Richland (also, Richvale) is a former settlement in Butte County, California. It still appeared at its prior location on maps as of 1912 but moved half a mile (0.8 km) west by 1952.

References

External links

Former settlements in Butte County, California
Former populated places in California